Neil Perkins (born 2 August 1979 is a British former amateur boxer who has won medals in international tournaments at welterweight.

Career
Perkins was a southpaw and fought for Kirkdale ABC in Liverpool. He won the 2002 and 2003 Amateur Boxing Association British middleweight title. He failed to qualify for the 2004 Summer Olympics after ending up in third place at the 4th AIBA European 2004 Olympic Qualifying Tournament in Baku, Azerbaijan.

He won the 2005 World Amateur Boxing Championships bronze medal after beating Robert Blazo, local hero Ha Na, European silver medallist, Armenia's Samuel Matevosyan by 18 points but losing 33–21 in the semi-final to Belarusian Magomed Nurutdinov. In Melbourne 2006, he won the bronze again at the 2006 Commonwealth Games, after losing to Vijender Kumar 14:22 in the welterweight semi finals.

At the Euro 2006 he lost in the first round to Serbian Zoran Mitrovic 14:34. At the 2007 World Championships he lost in the first round to Mitrovic. In 2010, he made a comeback at middleweight and was comprehensively beaten by Hosea Burton in the ABA championships.

External links
Profile
Bio
2005 results

References

1979 births
Living people
Heavyweight boxers
Prizefighter contestants
Boxers at the 2006 Commonwealth Games
England Boxing champions
AIBA World Boxing Championships medalists
Commonwealth Games bronze medallists for England
English male boxers
Commonwealth Games medallists in boxing
Boxers from Liverpool
Medallists at the 2006 Commonwealth Games